Longfellow School may refer to:

in the United States
(by state and then city)
 Longfellow School (Boise, Idaho), listed on the NRHP in Ada County, Idaho
Longfellow Grade School, Butte, Montana, listed on the NRHP in Silver Bow County, Montana
 Longfellow School (Raton, New Mexico), listed on the NRHP in Colfax County, New Mexico
Henry Longfellow School, in northeast Philadelphia, Pennsylvania, NRHP-listed
 Longfellow School (Swissvale, Pennsylvania), NRHP-listed
 Longfellow School (Rutland, Vermont), NRHP-listed
 Longfellow School (Madison, Wisconsin), NRHP-listed
 Longfellow School (Ripon, Wisconsin), listed on the NRHP in Fond du Lac County, Wisconsin